Meikle Earnock Halt railway station served the suburb of Meikle Earnock, South Lanarkshire, Scotland, from 1863 to 1943 on the Hamilton and Strathaven Railway.

History 
The station was opened as Meikle Earnock on 2 February 1863 by the Hamilton and Strathaven Railway. On the southbound platform was the station building and on the east side was the signal box. To the south was a marshalling yard, Eddiewood Junction Yard. To the north was a mineral line that ran to Earnock Quarry. The station's name was changed to Meikle Earnock Halt in 1941, a year after it was downgraded to an unstaffed halt in 1940. The station closed on 12 December 1943.

References 

Disused railway stations in South Lanarkshire
Former North British Railway stations
Railway stations in Great Britain opened in 1863
Railway stations in Great Britain closed in 1943
1863 establishments in Scotland
1943 disestablishments in Scotland
Buildings and structures in Hamilton, South Lanarkshire